Driver's license in the Philippines consists of three types. These are student permit, non-professional, and professional. The minimum age for driving in the Philippines is 16 years old, provided that the driver has applied for a student permit and is accompanied by a duly licensed person, whether professional or non-professional. An applicant can only apply for a non-professional driver's license one month after acquiring a student permit. An applicant needs to have a non-professional driver's license for six months to be eligible for a professional driver's license. An applicant must pass both the Land Transportation Office written exam and a driving exam. If the applicant fails the tests, the applicant must wait for a month before being able to take the tests again.

Restriction codes 
Drivers are assigned a restriction code that designates which type of vehicle they can operate. Restriction codes are based on the kind of vehicle and their gross vehicle weight. A new restriction code system which is similar to the European and United Kingdom version is now in use since January of 2021. A driver approved of driving a manual transmission(MT) vehicle is allowed to also drive automatic, whereas those approved for automatic transmission (AT) can not drive manual.  

*Note: Restrictions 1, 2, and 4 only apply to non-professional driver's licenses.

New restriction codes since January 2021

Condition code 
Applicants are assessed during application if they have certain impairments that could impede their driving capability. They are then assigned a condition code(s) if they fall within a category.

*Note: Special driving conditions and special equipment to be used shall be the assessed by a Land Transportation Office driver evaluator.

Use in other countries

ASEAN member states
The Kuala Lumpur Agreement of 1985 authorizes holders of driving licenses issued by the government of an Association of Southeast Asian Nations (ASEAN) member state to drive in any ASEAN country without the need for an international driving permit.

Australia 
Overseas licenses are allowed to be used in Australia for a period of three months, with some allowing six months for visitors with a permanent visa. Permanent Australian residents are obliged to apply for an Australian driver's license, with some states requiring it.

Spain 
As of April 16, 2010, an agreement was signed between the Filipino and Spanish governments allowing Filipinos to use their Philippine driver's license in Spain.

Foreign driving license
Foreigners who hold a valid driver's license issued by the road authority of their home country can drive in the Philippines for up to 90 days upon arrival provided that their license is written in English. If the license is not in English, an official English translation from the local embassy of the issuing country is required.

Holders of driving licenses issued by any ASEAN member-state government are allowed to drive in the Philippines.

References

External links 
 Official Philippine Land Transportation Office website

Philippines
Road transportation in the Philippines
Identity documents of the Philippines